Byorn Sandvliet is a Surinamese professional footballer who plays as a midfielder for SVB Eerste Divisie club Robinhood and the Suriname national team.

References 

Year of birth missing (living people)
Living people
Surinamese footballers
Association football midfielders
S.V. Transvaal players
SVB Eerste Divisie players
Suriname international footballers